Wallumbilla is a rural town and locality in the Maranoa Region, Queensland, Australia.

Geography 

Wallumbilla is situated on the Warrego Highway, five hours by road west from Brisbane, just east of Roma in South West Queensland.

To the north of Wallumbilla the Great Dividing Range (in this region no more than a bumpy watershed) passes roughly ESE to NNW. The town is sandwiched between Wallumbilla & Middle Creeks as they flow south toward the Condamine/Balonne River.

Wallumbilla is on the Western railway line and is served by the Wallumbilla railway station.

History 
The name Wallumbilla was the name of a pastoral run leased by Charles Coxen, The name is presumed to come from the indigenous Mandandanji language and reportedly means wallu=plenty and billa=jew fish.

Wallumbilla Provisional School opened on 25 October 1893, becoming Wallumbilla State School on 1 September 1894. From January 1964, secondary schooling was offered in the Memorial Hall opposite the school, until it became possible to accommodate the secondary students on the school site from April 1965. A swimming pool was added to the school in 1981.

On Saturday 17 May 1929, the Wallumbilla School of Arts Memorial Hall was officially opened by Godfrey Morgan, the local Member of the Queensland Legislative Assembly for Murilla.

On 1 December 1956, The Westlander collided head-on with the Western Mail which was stationary at Wallumbilla railway station. The crash killed 5 people and injured 11 or 13 people. There is a memorial at the railway station commemorating the crash.

In 2017, a combined Rural Fire station and SES facility was built.

Heritage listings
Wallumbilla has a number of heritage-listed sites, including:
 George Street: Nostalgic Queen's Theatre

Economy 
Traditionally Wallumbilla's main industries were dairy and beef cattle, now the main industries are cropping and beef cattle.  The main crops include sorghum and wheat.

Locals believe that if not for the discovery of gas at nearby hub Roma, Wallumbilla would have flourished into a similar hub, as the discovery of gas in 1908 near Roma preluded the Wallumbilla cattle sale yards (a thriving business according to local history) to move up to Roma, accentuating its growth.

A major gas hub is in preparation for Wallumbilla, planned to start operation in 2014.

Education 

Wallumbilla State School is a government primary and secondary (Prep-10) school for boys and girls at 22 High Street. In 2016, the school had an enrolment of 106 students with 15 teachers (12 full-time equivalent) and 10 non-teaching staff (7 full-time equivalent). In 2018, the school had an enrolment of 126 students with 16 teachers (12 full-time equivalent) and 13 non-teaching staff (8 full-time equivalent).

Most of these students hail from properties surrounding town, as well as the high school students who attended primary school in the neighbouring towns of Jackson and Yuleba. 

The nearest state high schools offering Years 11 and 12 of secondary school are Roma State College and St. John's College in Roma (40 kilometres west) and Miles State High School in Miles (90 kilometres east).

Facilities 
Wallumbilla Police Station is on the corner of Flinders Street and High Street.

Wallumbilla Rural Fire Station and SES Facility is a combined emergency service centre at 1-3 Russell Street.

Wallumbilla Community Clinic (sometimes called Wallumbillla Hospital) is a government health facility at 1-7 West Street (corner of Stakeyard Road).

Wallumbilla Monumental & Lawn Cemetery is on the north-west corner of Wallumbilla North Road and Stolz Lane.

Media 
ABQ transmits to Wallumbilla through its Roma relay station ABRAQ-2 at 26°34′20″S 148°51′1″E (Timbury Hills Transmitter site).[citation needed]

Network Ten and its sister channels 10 Bold and 10 Peach transmits to Wallumbilla through its regional area affiliate, CDT.[citation needed]

The Nine Network and its sister channels 9Go! and 9Gem transmits to Wallumbilla through its regional area affiliate, IMP.[citation needed]

The Seven Network and its sister channels 7two and 7mate transmits to Wallumbilla through its remote area affiliate, ITQ.[citation needed]

The Special Broadcasting Service and its sister channels transmits to Wallumbilla.[citation needed]

Amenities 

Wallumbilla's Calico Cottage, open seven days a week, is the town's Visitor Information Centre. As well as this, Calico Cottage sells locally produced arts and crafts along with refreshments. The Calico Cottage also serves as Wallumbilla's main Intercity Bus Stop which is used by Greyhound Australia as a regular timetabled stop on its main intercity services:

 Gx493 (Brisbane - Mount Isa)
 Gx494 (Mount Isa - Brisbane)
 Gx495 (Brisbane - Charleville)
 Gx496 (Charleville - Brisbane)
The town also contains three churches, as well as a Masonic Hall.  Other amenities include a hotel/pub, a news agency, and a petrol station.

Wallumbilla has a heritage complex and visitor information centre. A Public Library (operated by the Maranoa Regional Council) operates in Wallumbilla in George Street.

The Wallumbilla branch of the Queensland Country Women's Association has its rooms at 15 College Street.

Wallumbilla School of Arts Memorial Hall is at 8 Chadstone Street.

References

External links

 
 
 Maranoa Online A portal servicing the Maranoa - a region encompassing Wallumbilla

Towns in Queensland
Maranoa Region
Localities in Queensland